Cauldron is a 2007 science fiction novel by American author Jack McDevitt. It is the sixth novel in the Academy series, featuring Priscilla Hutchins.

Plot summary 

Humanity now generally disregards spaceflight, and space exploration is in massive decline. Hutchins has retired from flying in space and now spends her days throwing fund-raisers in order to finance space exploration through private investors. The space program is on the edge of being terminated, when a physicist named Jon Silvestri announces that he has completed a much more efficient faster-than-light-speed engine, capable of reaching destinations in mere fractions of the time previously required, travelling much farther than Pluto in just under 8 seconds. 

With this new drive, destinations such as the galactic core are mere months of travel away. Hutch and the characters in the novel use that engine to journey to the centre of the galaxy, while making stops at a few points of interest including Sigma 2711, a star system 14,000 light years away and the origin of mankind's only received signal from an alien race, a black hole with a mysterious artificial companion and the supposed home planet of a galaxy-wide surveillance system. But their true mission lies at the heart of the galaxy, the supposed origin of the mysterious Omega Clouds, mysterious clouds of energy that travel through space, attacking and destroying any structure with right angles, at regular 8000-year cycles.
As they near their final objective it becomes clear that the true purpose of the clouds is beyond anything any of them could have possibly imagined.

Reception 
Kirkus Reviews describes the book as "Not peak McDevitt — slow to develop and not especially surprising — but workmanlike and brimming with the author's trademark low-key charms."

References 

Novels by Jack McDevitt
2007 American novels
2007 science fiction novels